Monarchy was the prevalent form of government in the history of Europe throughout the Middle Ages, only occasionally competing with communalism, notably in the case of the Maritime republics and the Swiss Confederacy.

Republicanism became more prevalent in the Early Modern period, but monarchy remained predominant in Europe during the 19th century. Since the end of World War I, however, most European monarchies have been abolished. There remain, as of 2023, twelve sovereign monarchies in Europe. Seven are kingdoms: Denmark, Norway, Sweden, the United Kingdom, Spain, the Netherlands, and Belgium. Andorra, Liechtenstein, and Monaco are principalities, while Luxembourg is a Grand Duchy. Vatican City is a theocratic, elective monarchy ruled by the Pope.

The monarchies can be divided into two broad classes: premodern states and those that gained their independence during or immediately after the Napoleonic Wars. Denmark, Norway, Sweden, the UK, Spain, and Andorra are the successors to premodern monarchies. Liechtenstein, the Netherlands, Belgium, and Luxembourg were established or gained independence through various methods during the Napoleonic Wars. The State of the Vatican City was recognized as a sovereign state administered by the Holy See in 1929.

Ten of these monarchies are hereditary, and two are elective: Vatican City (the Pope, elected at the papal conclave), and Andorra (technically a semi-elective diarchy, the joint heads of state being the elected President of France and the Bishop of Urgell, appointed by the Pope).

Most of the monarchies in Europe are constitutional monarchies, which means that the monarch does not influence the politics of the state: either the monarch is legally prohibited from doing so, or the monarch does not utilize the political powers vested in the office by convention. The exceptions are Liechtenstein and Monaco, which are usually considered semi-constitutional monarchies due to the large influence the princes still have on politics, and Vatican City, which is an absolute monarchy. There is currently no major campaign to abolish the monarchy (see monarchism and republicanism) in any of the twelve states, although there is a small minority of republicans in many of them (e.g. the political organisation Republic in the United Kingdom). Currently six of the twelve monarchies are members of the European Union: Belgium, Denmark, Luxembourg, the Netherlands, Spain and Sweden.

At the start of the 20th century, France, Switzerland and San Marino were the only European nations to have a republican form of government. The ascent of republicanism to the political mainstream started only at the beginning of the 20th century, facilitated by the toppling of various European monarchies after the end of World War I; as at the beginning of the 21st century, most of the states in Europe are republics with either a directly or indirectly elected head of state. The latest European state to abolish monarchy was the State of Malta which became a republic in December 1974.

History

Origins 

The notion of kingship in Europe ultimately originates in systems of tribal kingship in prehistoric Europe. The Minoan (c. 3200 – c. 1400 BCE) and Mycenaean civilisation (c. 1600 – c. 1100 BCE) provide the earliest examples of monarchies in protohistoric Greece. Thanks to the decipherment of the Linear B script in 1952, much knowledge has been acquired about society in the Mycenaean realms, where the kings functioned as leaders of palace economies. The role of kings changed in the following Greek Dark Ages (c. 1100 – c. 750 BCE) to big gentleman farmers with military power.

Archaic and classical antiquity 

Since the beginning of antiquity, monarchy confronted several republican forms of government, wherein executive power was in the hands of a number of people that elected leaders in a certain way instead of appointing them by hereditary succession. During the archaic period (c. 750–500 BCE), kingship disappeared in almost all Greek poleis, and also in Rome (then still a barely significant town). After the demise of kingship, the Greek city-states were initially most often led by nobility (aristocracy), after which their economic and military power base crumbled. Next, in almost all poleis tyrants usurped power for two generations (tyranny, 7th and especially 6th century BCE), after which gradually forms of governments led by the wealthy (oligarchy) or assemblies of free male citizens (democracy) emerged in Classical Greece (mainly after 500 BCE). Athenian democracy (6th century–322 BCE) is the best-known example of the latter form; classical Sparta (c. 550–371 BCE) was a militaristic polis with a remarkable mix between monarchy (dual kingship), aristocracy (Gerousia) and democracy (Apella); the Roman Republic (c. 509–27 BCE) had a mixed constitution of oligarchy, democracy and especially aristocracy. The city-states of the Etruscan civilization (which arose during the Villanovan period, c. 900–700 BCE) appear to have followed a similar pattern, with the original monarchies being overthrown and replaced by oligarchic republics in the 5th and 4th centuries BCE.

The dominant poleis of Athens and Sparta were weakened by warring each other, especially during the Peloponnesian War (431–404 BCE) won by Sparta. They were defeated and ruled by Thebes for a time (371–360 BCE), after which Sparta's role was over. Eventually, all of Greece was subjugated by the Macedonian monarchy in 338 BCE, that put an end to the era of free autonomous city-states, and Athenian democracy as well in 322 BCE. In the subsequent Hellenistic period (334–30 BCE) numerous diadochs (successors of Alexander the Great) fought one another for the kingship of Macedon, definitively obtained by the Antigonids in 277 BCE. Meanwhile, the Phoenician city-state of Carthage, located in present-day Tunisia, aside from settling large swaths of North Africa's coast, also set up several colonies on Sicily, Sardinia, Corsica, the Baleares and in southern Iberia. The Carthaginian empire, according to tradition founded in 814 BCE, started out as a monarchy, but in the 4th century transformed into a republic where suffets ("judges") ruled. Finally, Rome gradually conquered all of Italy (primarily after 350 BCE), and defeated Carthage in the Punic Wars (264–146 BCE). In 168, Macedon was subdued by the Romans, and partitioned into four client republics. These were annexed as Roman provinces in 148, as happened to Greece in 146, making Rome's territory envelop all of literate Europe. The remainder of Iberia, the Illyrian coast and eventually Gaul by general Julius Caesar were added to the Roman Republic, which however was experiencing an institutional crisis. After defeating his rival Pompey, Caesar was appointed dictator to restore order. He almost managed to found a dynasty in the process, but was killed by a republican cabal led by Brutus in 44 BCE.

Roman Empire and legacy 

Caesar's adoptive son Octavian prevailed in the ensuing civil war, and converted the Roman Republic into the Roman Empire in 27 BCE. He took on the name Augustus, with the rather humble title of princeps ("first [citizen]"), as if he were merely primus inter pares ("first among equals"), when he had in fact founded a monarchy. This limited emperorship (Principate) was strengthened in 284 by Diocletian to absolute reign (Dominate). The Empire recognised various client kingdoms under imperial suzerainty; most of these were in Asia, but tribal client kings were also recognized by the Roman authorities in Britannia. Most of the barbarian kingdoms established in the 5th century
(the kingdoms of the Suebi, Burgundi, Vandals, Franks, Visigoths, Ostrogoths) recognised the Roman Emperor at least nominally, and Germanic kingdoms would continue to mint coins depicting the Roman emperor well into the 6th century.
It was this derivation of the authority of kingship from the Christian Roman Empire that would be at the core of the medieval institution of kingship in Europe and its notion of the divine right of kings, as well as the position of the Pope in Latin Christendom, the restoration of the Roman Empire under Charlemagne and the derived concept of the Holy Roman Empire in Western and Central Europe.

Medieval Europe 
The monarchies of Europe in the Christian Middle Ages derived their claim from Christianisation and the divine right of kings, partly influenced by the notion of sacral kingship inherited from Germanic antiquity.
The great powers of Europe in the Early Modern period were the result of a gradual process of centralization of power taking place over the course of the Middle Ages.

The Early Middle Ages begin with a fragmentation of the former Western Roman Empire into "barbarian kingdoms". In Western Europe, the kingdom of the Franks developed into the Carolingian Empire by the 8th century, and the kingdoms of Anglo-Saxon England were unified into the kingdom of England by the 10th century.
With the breakup of the Carolingian Empire in the 9th century, the system of feudalism places kings at the head of a pyramid of relationships between liege lords and vassals, dependent on the regional rule of barons, and the intermediate positions of counts (or earls) and dukes. The core of European feudal manorialism in the High Middle Ages were the territories of the kingdom of France, the Holy Roman Empire (centered on the nominal kingdoms of Germany and Italy) and the kingdoms of England and Scotland.

Early Modern Europe 

With the rise of nation-states and the Protestant Reformation, the theory of divine right justified the king's absolute authority in both political and spiritual matters. The theory came to the fore in England under the reign of James I of England (1603–1625, also known as James VI of Scotland 1567–1625). Louis XIV of France (1643–1715) strongly promoted the theory as well.
Early modern Europe was dominated by the Wars of Religion, notably the Thirty Years' War, during which the major European monarchies developed into centralised great powers sustained by their colonial empires.
The main European monarchical powers in the early modern period were:
the Kingdom of France with its colonial empire
the Portuguese Empire of the Kingdom of Portugal (personal union with Spain 1580–1640)
the Spanish Empire of Habsburg Spain (after 1700 Bourbon Spain)
the British Empire of the English and Scottish Union of the Crowns (after 1707 the Kingdom of Great Britain)
the Holy Roman Empire was effectively dominated by the Habsburg monarchy and an emerging by Prussia
the Tsardom of Russia
the kingdom of Poland as the Polish–Lithuanian Commonwealth
the kingdom of Sweden rose to the status of great power as the comparatively short-lived Swedish Empire due to the Thirty Years' War
the kingdom of Denmark-Norway

The House of Habsburg became the most influential royal dynasty in continental Europe by the 17th century, divided into the Spanish and Austrian branches.

Modern Europe 

The modern resurgence of parliamentarism and anti-monarchism began with the French Revolution (1789–99). The absolutist Kingdom of France was first transformed to a constitutional monarchy (1791–92), before being fully abolished on 21 September 1792, and eventually the former king even executed, to the other European courts' great shock. During the subsequent French Revolutionary Wars (1792–1799), the great European monarchies were unable to restore the monarchy; instead, the French First Republic expanded and annexed neighbouring territories, or converted them into loyal sister republics. Meanwhile, the German Mediatization of 1803 thoroughly rearranged the political structure of the Holy Roman Empire, with many small principalities and all ecclesiastical lands being annexed by larger monarchies. After Napoleon seized power, however, he gradually constructed a new imperial order in French-controlled Europe, first by crowning himself Emperor of the French in 1804, and then converting the sister republics into monarchies ruled by his relatives. In July 1806 due to Napoleon's campaigns a larger number of states in the Western part of Germany seceded The Holy Roman Empire and this brought in August 1806 the emperor Francis II to decide dissolving the entire empire, bringing an end to 1833 years of history of Roman emperors in Europe.

Following Napoleon's defeat in 1814 and 1815, the reactionary Congress of Vienna determined that all of Europe should consist of strong monarchies (with the exception of Switzerland and a few insignificant republics). In France, the Bourbon dynasty was restored, replaced by the liberal July Monarchy in 1830, before the entire monarchy was again abolished during the Revolutions of 1848. The popular Napoleon III was able to proclaim himself Emperor in 1852, thus founding the Second French Empire.

The kingdoms of Sicily and Naples ("Two Sicilies") were absorbed into the kingdom of Sardinia to form the Kingdom of Italy in 1861. Austria and Prussia vied to unite all German states under their banner, with Prussia emerging victorious in 1866. It succeeded in provoking Napoleon III to declare war, leading to the defeat of France, and the absorption of the southern German states into the German Empire in the process (1870–71). From the ashes of the Second Empire rose the French Third Republic, the only great republican European power until World War I.

Much of 19th century politics was characterised by the division between anti-monarchist radicalism and monarchist conservatism.
The Kingdom of Spain was briefly abolished in 1873, restored 1874–1931 and again in 1975 (or in 1947).
The Kingdom of Portugal was abolished in 1910. The Russian Empire ended in 1917, the Kingdom of Prussia in 1918.
The Kingdom of Hungary fell under Habsburg rule in 1867 and was dissolved in 1918 (restored 1920–1946). Likewise, the Kingdom of Bohemia under Habsburg rule was dissolved in 1918. The Ottoman sultanate was abolished in 1922 and replaced by the Republic of Türkiye the following year.

The Napoleonic Wars transformed the political landscape of Europe, and a number of modern kingdoms were formed in a resurgence of monarchism after the dissolution of the Holy Roman Empire and the defeat of the French Empire:

 the Austrian Empire and  Austria-Hungary (1804–1918)
 the Kingdom of Württemberg (1805–1918)
 the Kingdom of Bavaria (1805–1918)
 the Kingdom of Saxony (1806–1918)
 the Kingdom of the Two Sicilies (1808–1861)
 the Kingdom of the Netherlands (1813/15 to present)
 an independent constitution for the Kingdom of Norway (1814 to present)
 the Kingdom of France ("Bourbon Restoration")  (1814–1830) followed by  the July Monarchy (Kingdom of France) (1830–1848)
 the Kingdom of Hanover (1814–1866)
 the Kingdom of Poland (1815–1867)
 the Kingdom of Belgium (1830 to present)
 the Kingdom of Greece (1832–1924 & 1935–1973)
 the Second French Empire (1852–1870)
 the Principality of Montenegro (1852–1910) continued as  the Kingdom of Montenegro (1910–1918)
 the Kingdom of Italy (1861–1946)
 the Principality of Romania (1862–1881) continued as the Kingdom of Romania (1882–1947)
 the German Empire (1871–1918)
 the Principality of Bulgaria (1878–1908) continued as the Kingdom of Bulgaria (1908–1946)
 the Principality of Serbia (1815–1882) continued as  the Kingdom of Serbia (1882–1918)
 the Principality of Albania (1914–1925)

Many countries abolished the monarchy in the 20th century and became republics, especially in the wake of either World War I or World War II.

New monarchies 

A few new monarchies emerged for a brief period of time in the final years of World War I:

 the Kingdom of Finland (1918–1919)
 the Kingdom of Lithuania (1918)
 the Kingdom of Poland (1917–1918)
 the Ukrainian State (Hetmanate) (1918)
 the United Baltic Duchy (1918)

Monarchies established or re-established during the interbellum period were:
 the Kingdom of Iceland (1918–1944)
 the Kingdom of Yugoslavia (1918–1945)
 the Kingdom of Hungary (1920–1946)
 the Irish Free State (1922–1937)
 the Kingdom of Albania (1928–1944)
 the Vatican City State governed by the Holy See (1929 to present)
 the Kingdom of Greece (1935–1973)

Monarchies established or re-established from 1940 and onwards:

 the Kingdom of Croatia (1941–1943)
 the Kingdom of Spain (1947 to present)
 the Kingdom of Malta (State of Malta) (1964–1974)

Territorial evolution

Current monarchies 
There are currently twelve monarchies in Europe. Eleven of these are constitutional monarchies while one (the Vatican City State) is an absolute monarchy.

Table of monarchies in Europe

Descriptions

Andorra 

Andorra has been a co-principality since the signing of a paréage in 1278, when the count of Foix and the bishop of La Seu d'Urgell agreed to share sovereignty over the landlocked country. The principality was briefly annexed in 1396 and again in 1512–1513 by the Crown of Aragon. The first female prince to rule Andorra was Isabella, Countess of Foix (1398–1413). After the title of the count of Foix had been passed to the kings of Navarre, and after Henry of Navarre had become Henry IV of France, an edict was issued in 1607 which established the French head of state as the legal successor to the count of Foix in regard to the paréage. Andorra was briefly annexed for a third time by the First French Empire together with Catalonia in 1812–1813. After the Empire's demise, Andorra became independent again. The current joint monarchs are Bishop Joan Enric Vives Sicília and President Emmanuel Macron of France.

Belgium 

Belgium has been a kingdom since 21 July 1831 without interruption, after it became independent from the United Kingdom of the Netherlands with Léopold I as its first king. While in a referendum held on 12 March 1950, 57.68 percent of the Belgians voted in favor of allowing Leopold III, whose conduct during World War II had been considered questionable and who had been accused of treason, to return to the throne; due to civil unrest, he opted to abdicate in favor of his son Baudouin on 16 July 1951. The current monarch is Philippe.

Denmark 

In Denmark, the monarchy goes back to the legendary kings before the 10th century and the Danish monarchy is the oldest in Europe (with the first attested historical king being Ongendus around the year 710). Currently, about 80 percent support keeping the monarchy. The current monarch is Margrethe II. The Danish monarchy also includes the Faroe Islands and Greenland which are parts of the Kingdom of Denmark with internal home rule. Due to this status, the monarch has no separate title for these regions. On her accession to the throne in 1972 Margrethe II, the present monarch, refrained from using the additional titles historically  associated with the Danish monarchs for more than 750 years and simply styled herself Queen of Denmark.

Liechtenstein 

Liechtenstein formally came into existence on 23 January 1719, when Charles VI, Holy Roman Emperor decreed the lordship of Schellenberg and the countship of Vaduz united and raised to the dignity of a principality. Liechtenstein was a part of the Holy Roman Empire until the Treaty of Pressburg was signed on 26 December 1805; this marked Liechtenstein's formal independence, though it was a member of the Confederation of the Rhine and the German Confederation afterwards. While Liechtenstein was still closely aligned with Austria-Hungary until World War I, it realigned its politics and its customs and monetary institutions with Switzerland instead. Having been a constitutional monarchy since 1921, Hans-Adam II demanded more influence in Liechtenstein's politics in the early 21st century, which he was granted in a referendum held on 16 March 2003, effectively making Liechtenstein a semi-constitutional monarchy again. However, technically speaking, Liechtenstein's monarchy remains fully constitutional, and the transition was merely from a parliamentary system to a semi-presidential system, and the constitutional changes also provide for the possibility of a referendum to abolish the monarchy entirely. The current monarch is Hans-Adam II, who turned over the day-to-day governing decisions to his son and heir Alois, Hereditary Prince of Liechtenstein on 15 August 2004.

Luxembourg 

Luxembourg has been an independent grand duchy since 9 June 1815. Originally, Luxembourg was in personal union with the United Kingdom of the Netherlands and the Kingdom of the Netherlands from 16 March 1815 until 23 November 1890. While Wilhelmina succeeded Willem III in the Netherlands, this was not possible in Luxembourg due to the order of succession being based on Salic law at that time; he was succeeded instead by Adolphe. In a referendum held on 28 September 1919, 80.34 per cent voted in favor of keeping the monarchy. The current monarch is Henri.

Monaco 

Monaco has been ruled by the House of Grimaldi since 1297. From 1793 until 1814, Monaco was under French control; the Congress of Vienna designated Monaco as being a protectorate of the Kingdom of Sardinia from 1815 until 1860, when the Treaty of Turin ceded the surrounding counties of Nice and Savoy to France. Menton and Roquebrune-Cap-Martin, part of Monaco until the mid-19th century before seceding in hopes of being annexed by Sardinia, were ceded to France in exchange for 4,000,000 French francs with the Franco-Monegasque Treaty in 1861, which also formally guaranteed Monaco its independence. Until 2002, Monaco would have become part of France had the house of Grimaldi ever died out; in a treaty signed that year, the two nations agreed that Monaco would remain independent even in such a case. The current monarch is Albert II.

Netherlands 

Though while not using the title of king until 1815, the Dutch Royal House has been an intricate part of the politics of the Low Countries since medieval times. In 1566, the stadtholder William of Orange became the main leader of the Dutch revolt against the Spanish Habsburgs that set off the Eighty Years' War and resulted in the formal independence of the United Provinces in 1581. He was born in the House of Nassau as Count of Nassau-Dillenburg. He became Prince of Orange in 1544 and is thereby the founder of the branch House of Orange-Nassau

His descendants became de facto heads of state of the Dutch Republic during the 16th to 18th centuries, which was an effectively hereditary role. For the last half century of its existence, it became an officially hereditary role and thus a monarchy (though maintaining republican pretense) under Prince William IV. His son, Prince William V, was the last stadtholder of the republic, whose own son, King William I, became the first king of the United Kingdom of the Netherlands, which was established on 16 March 1815 after the Napoleonic Wars. With the independence of Belgium on 21 July 1831, the Netherlands formally became the Kingdom of the Netherlands. The current monarch is Willem-Alexander.

Norway 

Norway was united and thus established for the first time in 872, as a kingdom. As a result of the unification of the Norwegian petty kingdoms, which traces the monarchs even further back in time, both legitimate and semi–legendary kings. It is thus one of the oldest monarchies in the world, along with the Swedish and Danish ones.  Norway was part of the Kalmar Union from 1397 until 1524, then part of Denmark–Norway from 1536 until 1814, and finally an autonomous part of the Union between Sweden and Norway from 1814 until 1905. Norway became completely independent again on 7 June 1905. Support for establishing a republic lies around 20 per cent. The current monarch is Harald V.

Spain 

Spain came into existence as a single, united kingdom under Charles I of Spain on 23 January 1516. The monarchy was briefly abolished by the First Spanish Republic from 11 February 1873 until 29 December 1874. The monarchy was abolished again on 14 April 1931, first by the Second Spanish Republic – which lasted until 1 April 1939 – and subsequently by the dictatorship of Francisco Franco, who ruled until his death on 20 November 1975. Monarchy was restored on 22 November 1975 under Juan Carlos I, who was also the monarch until his abdication in 2014. His son Felipe VI is the current monarch.
The 1978 constitution confirms the title of the monarch is the King of Spain, but that he may also use other titles historically associated with the Crown,
including the kingdoms of Castile and León, Aragon, the Two Sicilies, Jerusalem, Navarre, Granada, Seville, Toledo, Valencia, Galicia, Sardinia, Córdoba, Corsica, etc.

Data from 2006 suggested that only 25 percent of Spaniards were in favor of establishing a republic; however, the numbers have increased since Juan Carlos I abdicated.

Sweden 

Sweden’s monarchy goes back almost as far as the Danish one, to the semilegendary kings before the 10th century, since then it has not been interrupted. However, the unification of the rivalling kingdoms Svealand and Götaland (consolidation of Sweden) did not occur until some time later, possibly in the early 11th century. The current royal family, the House of Bernadotte, has reigned since 1818. The current monarch is Carl XVI Gustaf.

United Kingdom 

The monarchy of the United Kingdom can be defined to have started either with the Kingdoms of England (871) or Scotland (843), with the Union of the Crowns on 24 March 1603, or with the Acts of Union of 1 May 1707. It was briefly interrupted by the English Interregnum, with the Commonwealth of England existing in its stead from 30 January 1649 until 15 December 1653 and from 26 May 1659 until 25 May 1660 and the Protectorate taking its place from 16 December 1653 until 25 May 1659. The current monarch is Charles III, son of Queen Elizabeth II.

Support for establishing a republic instead of a monarchy was around 18 per cent in the United Kingdom in 2006, while a majority thinks that there will still be a monarchy in the United Kingdom in ten years' time, public opinion is rather uncertain about a monarchy still existing in fifty years and a clear majority believes that the monarchy will no longer exist a century after the poll. Public opinion is, however, certain that the monarchy will still exist in thirty years.

The monarch of the United Kingdom is also the monarch of the fourteen other Commonwealth realms, none of which are in Europe. Some of these realms have significant levels of support for republicanism.

Vatican City 
Differently from the Holy See, in existence for almost two thousand years, the Vatican City was not a sovereign state until the 20th century. In the 19th century the annexation of the Papal States by the Kingdom of Sardinia, and the subsequent establishment of the Kingdom of Italy, was not recognized by the Vatican.  However, by the Lateran treaty of 1929, the Kingdom of Italy recognized Vatican City as an independent state, and vice versa. Since then, the elected monarch of the Vatican City state has been the current pope. The pope still officially carries the title "King of the Ecclesiastical State" (in Latin: Rex Status Ecclesiæ).

Succession laws 

The succession order is determined by primogeniture in most European monarchies. Belgium, Denmark, Luxembourg, the Netherlands, Norway, Sweden and the United Kingdom now adhere to absolute primogeniture, whereby the eldest child inherits the throne, regardless of gender; Monaco and Spain have the older system of male-preference primogeniture, while Liechtenstein uses agnatic primogeniture. In 1990, Norway granted absolute primogeniture to the Norwegian throne, meaning that the eldest child, regardless of gender, takes precedence in the line of succession. This was not, however, done retroactively (as, for example, Sweden had done in 1980), meaning that Haakon, Crown Prince of Norway continues to take precedence over his older sister.

There are plans to change to absolute primogeniture in Spain through a rather complicated process, as the change entails a constitutional amendment. Two successive parliaments will have to pass the law by a two-thirds majority and then put it to a referendum. As parliament has to be dissolved and [Elections in Spain|new elections]] have to be called after the constitutional amendment is passed for the first time, then Prime Minister of Spain José Luis Rodríguez Zapatero indicated he would wait until the end of his first term in 2008 before passing the law, although this deadline passed without the referendum being called. The amendment enjoys strong public support.

To change the order of succession to the British throne, all the sovereign states with the King as head of state—collectively known as Commonwealth realms—must agree. In the United Kingdom, the Succession to the Crown Act 2013 was enacted, and after legislation in some other realms, the changes came into effect across all realms simultaneously on 26 March 2015.

Liechtenstein uses agnatic primogeniture (aka Salic law), which completely excludes women from the order of succession unless there are no male heirs of any kind present, and was criticised for this by a United Nations committee for this perceived gender equality issue in November 2007.

Luxembourg also used agnatic primogeniture until 20 June 2011, when absolute primogeniture was introduced.

The co-princes of Andorra are the president of the French Republic, who is elected by the French people, and the bishop of La Seu d'Urgell, who is appointed by the Pope.

The absolute monarch of Vatican City, the Pope, is elected by the College of Cardinals. The current ruler is Pope Francis.

Costs 
One issue that occasionally rises is whether the monarchies are too expensive when compared to republics, or whether particular monarchies are more expensive than others, to maintain. This comparison may be hard to draw, since financial administration may differ radically from country to country, and not all profits and costs are publicly known, and because of different arrangements regarding the private property of the monarch. In the UK, the Crown Estate has a special legal status making it neither government property nor the private property of the monarch. Revenues from these hereditary possessions have been placed at the disposition of the British government (thus proceeding directly to the Treasury) by every monarch since the accession of George III in 1760; the revenues of GBP 304.1 million (fiscal year of 2015/16) far exceed the expenses of the British royal family in this sense resulting in a "negative cost" of the British monarchy.

In 2016, Dutch newspaper de Volkskrant published an overview of the annual expenditure (excluding security expenses) of all European royal houses (not counting Luxembourg and the four monarchical European microstates).

Source: de Volkskrant (2016), based on the royal houses' websites of the seven monarchies, professor Herman Matthijs' 2013 study, the Dutch National Budget 2017, and ABCTOPConsult.

In 2013, professor Herman Matthijs from Ghent University calculated the costs of the seven EU monarchies plus Norway, and compared them to the EU's two most populous republics, France and Germany. His four main conclusions were:
 The personal salaries of presidents are lower than those of monarchs;
 The transparency differs between republics and monarchies, and is formally regulated in republics;
 In republics, pension costs of former heads of state are higher, although the figures don't say so;
 The existence of subsidies to family members of the heads of state in some monarchies increases their expenses.
He stressed that the financial administration's transparency differs enormously between countries; especially the non-transparent monarchies may be much more expensive than is publicly known. This means comparing them to republics, especially the very transparent administration of France where citizens can know exactly what they pay for, may be unfair. In a 2015 interview with NRC Handelsblad, Matthijs commented that the then-known €7.7 million allotted to the royal house in Spain's national budget was 'unbelievable': "I can't find out more, but I understand from the media that the total expenses of the Spanish house may be as much as 80 million."

Calls for abolition 

Calls for the abolition of Europe's monarchies were widespread since the development of republicanism in the 17th to 18th centuries during the Enlightenment. During the French Revolution, the Ancien Régime in France was abolished, and in all territories the French First Republic conquered during the following Coalition Wars, sister republics were proclaimed. However, after Napoleon crowned himself Emperor of the French in 1804, all of these (except Switzerland) were converted back to monarchies headed by his relatives. The post-Napoleonic European Restoration reaffirmed the monarchical balance of power on the continent.

In subsequent decades, republicanism would regain lost ground with the rise of liberalism, nationalism, and later socialism. The Revolutions of 1848 were largely inspired by republicanism. Most of Europe's monarchies were abolished either during or following World War I or World War II, and the remaining monarchies were transformed into constitutional monarchies.

Republican movements in Europe remain active up to present, though their political clout is limited in most European monarchies. The most prominent organisations campaigning to eliminate one or more of Europe's remaining monarchies and/or to liquidate assets reserved for reigning families are affiliated with the Alliance of European Republican Movements, but there are smaller independent initiatives as well, such as Hetis2013 in the Netherlands. Also, some political parties (e.g. Podemos in Spain) have stepped up and called for national referendums to abolish monarchies.

Calls for restoration 

The political influence of monarchism in former European monarchies is very limited.

There are several monarchist parties in France, most notably the Action Française (established 1899) and Alliance Royale (established 2001).
Monarchist parties also exist in the Czech Republic (1991), in Greece (2010), in Germany (1959), in Italy (1972), in Poland (1988) and in Russia (2012).

Otto von Habsburg renounced all pretense to the Habsburg titles in 1958, and monarchism in Austria has next to no political influence; a German monarchist organisation called Tradition und Leben has been in existence since 1959.
Monarchism in Bavaria has had more significant support, including Franz Josef Strauss, minister-president of Bavaria from 1978–1988.

Alexander, Crown Prince of Yugoslavia is a proponent of re-creating a constitutional monarchy in Serbia and sees himself as the rightful king. He believes that monarchy could give Serbia "stability, continuity and unity". A number of political parties and organizations support a constitutional parliamentary monarchy in Serbia. The Serbian Orthodox Church has openly supported the restoration of the monarchy. The assassinated former Serbian Prime Minister Zoran Đinđić was often seen in the company of the prince and his family, supporting their campaigns and projects, although his Democratic Party never publicly embraced monarchy. In 2011 an online open access poll by Serbian middle-market tabloid newspaper Blic showed that 64% of Serbians support restoring the monarchy. Another poll in May 2013 had 39% of Serbians supporting the monarchy, with 32% against it. On 27 July 2015, newspaper Blic published a poll "Da li Srbija treba da bude monarhija?" ("Should Serbia be a monarchy?"); 49.8% respondents expressed support in a reconstitution of monarchy, 44.6% were opposed and 5.5% were indifferent.

According to a 2007 opinion poll conducted at the request of the Romanian royal family, only 14% of Romanians were in favour of the restoration of the monarchy. Another 2008 poll found that only 16% of Romanians are monarchists. In December 2017, on the backdrop of the increased capital of trust in the Royal House of Romania, re-emerging with the death of King Michael, the executive chairman of the ruling Social Democratic Party Nicolae Bădălau said that one could organize a referendum on the transition to the monarchical ruling form, arguing that "it is not a bad thing, considering that the countries that have the monarchs are developed countries", being a project of the future.

See also 
 List of European Union member states by political system
 List of current monarchies
 List of monarchies
 List of dynasties
 List of political systems in France
 Monarchies in the Americas
 Monarchies in Oceania
 Monarchies in Africa
 Monarchies in Asia

Notes

References

Further reading

External links 

 
Europe